Gökçekaya is a village in the Laçin District of Çorum Province in Turkey. Its population is 81 (2022).

References

Villages in Laçin District